Al-Hurr Sport Club, is an Iraqi football team based in Karbalaa, that plays in Iraq Division Two.

Managerial history
  Maitham Dael-Haq
 Ahmed Awad

See also
 2012–13 Iraq FA Cup
 2016–17 Iraq FA Cup

References

External links
 Al-Hurr SC on Goalzz.com
 Iraq Clubs- Foundation Dates

2003 establishments in Iraq
Association football clubs established in 2003
Football clubs in Karbala
Karbala